Venezuela will participate in the 2011 Parapan American Games.

Medalists

Archery

Venezuela will send one male athlete to compete.

Athletics

Venezuela will send 41 male and 9 female athletes to compete.

Boccia

Venezuela will send seven male athletes to compete.

Cycling

Venezuela will send five male athletes to compete. Three male athletes will compete in the road cycling tournament, while two male athletes will compete in the track cycling tournament.

Judo

Venezuela will send six male and two female athletes to compete.

Powerlifting

Venezuela will send five male and four female athletes to compete.

Swimming

Venezuela will send eleven male and six female swimmers to compete.

Table tennis

Venezuela will send seven male and three female table tennis players to compete.

Nations at the 2011 Parapan American Games
2011 in Venezuelan sport
Venezuela at the Pan American Games